Kenny McBain (28 July 1946 – 22 April 1989), was a Scottish TV director and producer.

He was producer of Inspector Morse, Boon and Grange Hill.

His directorial credits include the Doctor Who story The Horns of Nimon (1979), episodes of Coronation Street and the Omega Factor episode Double Vision.

McBain attended Hutchesons' Grammar School in Glasgow and won a place to study music at Harvard University. deciding eventually to concentrate on drama. His name can be found on the 'wall of fame' at BAFTA headquarters in Piccadilly, London, having been nominated for a BAFTA award for his work on Morse.

McBain died in April 1989, aged 42.

References

External links

Article on McBain

1989 deaths
British television producers
British television directors
1946 births
People educated at Hutchesons' Grammar School